"Je ne suis pas un héros" (or "Je n'suis pas un héros") is a song written by Daniel Balavoine for Johnny Hallyday, who included in on his 1980 studio album À partir de maintenant.

Later that year Balavoine included his own recording of the song on his album Un autre monde. His version was also released as a single.

Composition and writing 
The song was written by Daniel Balavoine specifically for Johnny Hallyday.

Charts

Daniel Balavoine version

References 

1980 songs
1980 singles
French songs
Daniel Balavoine songs
Johnny Hallyday songs
Songs written by Daniel Balavoine